Strongyloides procyonis is a parasitic roundworm infecting the small intestine of the raccoon, Procyon lotor, hence its name. It was first described from Louisiana. It is morphologically similar to S. stercoralis, and as such infections of S. procyonis in humans, dogs, and other animals might be mistaken for the former.

References

Further reading

External links

Strongylidae
Parasitic nematodes of mammals
Nematodes described in 1966